Jacobus van Braam (b. Bergen op Zoom, in the Netherlands, 1 April 1729, d. 1 August 1792 Charleville, France) was a sword master and mercenary who trained the 19-year-old George Washington in 1751 or shortly thereafter. He was also retained by Washington as a translator.

Biography
Van Braam entered the British naval service and acted as lieutenant with Lawrence Washington, George Washington's elder half brother. They served under Admiral Vernon in the expedition to Carthagena. Then, accompanying Lawrence Washington to Mount Vernon, Van Braam was taken on to train George Washington just after Washington was appointed a militia leader for his district with the nominal rank of major. Van Braam gave Washington much instruction as to fencing, flags, fortification and the armies of Europe. Lawrence Washington also trained George at this time, as did Lawrence's cronies, and an adjutant named "Muse" (no first name given) who taught George the "evolution of arms."  According to the 1855 biography of Washington by Washington Irving:

Curiously other biographers (notably, John Marshall) mention Van Braam only as "an interpreter" brought along on the preliminary diplomatic expeditions leading up to the culmination of his earlier actions against the French, and not as a longtime associate and instructor who campaigned with his brother and schooled George Washington in the art of the sword and other military matters. At the Battle of Great Meadows in July 1754,

On account of his alleged wrong rendering of one word, Van Braam received more blame than praise for his services, while others made it the occasion for criticism of Washington himself. The voluminous controversy, which arose in the Virginia colonial legislature over Van Braam's asserted mistranslation, could hardly have arisen in New York, where the Dutch language was generally spoken, and the Netherlanders' association of ideas with the use of the word "assassin," which was not then in the Dutch language, but common in French and English, was better understood.

The ordinary meaning of this word "assassin," as used in military parlance at this time, was not that of a dastardly or prowling murderer, but rather that of a soldier who attacks suddenly without warning; and this seems to have been the method of the impetuous, young George Washington, in July 1754, when he rushed upon the French party, during which Jumonville was killed.

Van Braam later joined the 60th Foot (The Royal American Regiment) and fought in the American Revolutionary War, serving on the British side. In a letter to Washington, he expressed personal regret at the change of relations and the fortune of war. He resigned his commission in 1779. He then settled in France.
He died in Charleville, Champagne, France on 7 August 1792.

Notes

1729 births
1792 deaths
Dutch mercenaries
Royal Netherlands Army personnel
Van Braam, Jacob
Van Braam, Jacob
Van Braam, Jacob
Van Braam, Jacob
People from Bergen op Zoom